Emirhan is a village in the Baskil District of Elazığ Province in Turkey. The village is populated by Kurds of the Dirêjan tribe and had a population of 103 in 2021.

The hamlets of Akarsu, Fakir, Keçili and Sütlüce are attached to the village.

References

Villages in Baskil District
Kurdish settlements in Elazığ Province